The National Key Deer Refuge is a  National Wildlife Refuge located on Big Pine Key and No Name Key in the Florida Keys in Monroe County, Florida.

Crocodile Lake National Wildlife Refuge, Great White Heron NWR, and Key West NWR are administered by the National Key Deer Refuge.

External links
 
 National Key Deer Refuge official site and information sheet and maps
 Florida Keys.com
 Bird checklist

National Wildlife Refuges in Monroe County, Florida
Florida Keys
Protected areas established in 1957
Wetlands of Florida
Landforms of Monroe County, Florida
1957 establishments in Florida
White-tailed deer